Lars Ardelius (1 November 1926 – 23 July 2012) was a Swedish psychologist and novelist. He was born in Falun, lived in Stockholm and died in Visby.

Ardelius made his literary debut in 1958. Among his novels are Och kungen var kung from 1976, Tid och otid from 1978, and Provryttare from 1981. He chaired the Swedish Authors' Union from 1982 to 1984. He was awarded the Dobloug Prize in 1986.

Bibliography
Dagligt allehanda, 1958
Mått och steg, 1959
Krafter och spel, 1962
Svävningar, 1963
Rök, 1964
Spritt språngande, 1965
Plagiat, 1968
Gösta Berglunds saga, 1970
Kronprinsarna, 1972
Smorgasbordet, 1974 (essays)
Och kungen var kung, 1976 (historic novel, part II, 19th century)
Tid och otid, 1978 (historic novel, part III, 20th century)
Provryttare, 1981 (historic novel, part IV, 20th century)
Nya Drömboken, 1982 (essays)
Ogjort, 1983
Större än störst, 1985
Barnsben, 1986
De små sändebuden, 1987
Skjuta i höjden, 1988
Sällskapsdjuret, 1989
Slutet; om dödens höghet och låghet, 1990 (together with P.C. Jersild)
Livtag, 1991
Kurage!, 1993
Resandets ensak, 1995 (essays)
Bitvargen, 1997 (självbiografi del IV)
Lilla sockerstunden, 1998 (4 långa noveller)
Världens ställe - herrgårdsroman, 2000
Ett hål i naturen, essäer om konst, 2002
Ingen ålder, 2003
Den helande skuggan, 2003
Hammarens slag och hjärtats, 2004
En lyckad begravning 2005
I vitögat (2006)
Där Satan rullar i sanden 2008
Privata liv 2009
Livs levande, 2010

References

1926 births
2012 deaths
20th-century Swedish novelists
21st-century Swedish novelists
Dobloug Prize winners
Swedish psychologists
Swedish male novelists
20th-century Swedish male writers
21st-century male writers